Kurityán is a village in Borsod-Abaúj-Zemplén county, Hungary.

Etymology
The name comes from the Slavic/Early Slovak koryto (manger) with the suffix -ťany used to derive place names referring to people. Initially the name of the valley.  1280/1413 Koryth.

References

External links 
 Street map 

Populated places in Borsod-Abaúj-Zemplén County